The Canada men's national junior volleyball team is the men's national under-21 volleyball team of Canada. The team is controlled by Volleyball Canada, which represents the country in international competitions - Junior NORCECA Championship and FIVB U21 World Championships. The Canadian junior national team is ranked 7th (as of September 2015) in the FIVB world ranking.

International competitions

Junior NORCECA Championship

  1998 Guatemala ––  Gold medal
  2000 Cuba –– 4th place
  2002 Canada ––  Gold medal
  2004 Canada –– 4th place
  2006 Mexico ––  Bronze medal
  2008 El Salvador ––  Silver medal
  2010 Canada ––  Silver medal
  2012 United States ––  Silver medal
  2014 El Salvador ––  Silver medal
  2016 Canada ––  Bronze medal
  2018 Cuba ––  Bronze medal

Junior Pan-American Cup
  2011 Panama ––  Silver medal
  2015 Canada ––  Bronze medal
 2017 Canada ––  Bronze medal
 2019 Peru ––  Silver medal
 2022 CUB ––  Bronze medal

U21 World Championship

  1977 Brazil –– 10th place
  1981 United States –– 13th place
  1985 Italy –– Did not qualify
  1987 Bahrain –– 12th place
  1989 Greece — Did not qualify
  1991 Egypt –– Did not qualify
  1993 Argentina –– Did not qualify
  1995 Malaysia — Did not qualify
  1997 Bahrain — Did not qualify
  1999 Thailand — 5th place
  2001 Poland — Did not qualify
  2003 Iran — 9th place
  2005 India –– Did not qualify
  2007 Morocco –– Did not qualify
  2009 India — 12th place
  2011 Brazil –– 11th place
  2013 Turkey –– 13th place
  2015 Mexico —  8th place
  2017 Czech Republic - 8th place
  2019 Bahrain - 12th place
   2021 Italy Bulgaria - 10th place

Current squad
The following is the Canadian roster in the 2016 Men's Junior NORCECA Volleyball Championship.

Head Coach: Gino Brousseau

External links
Official website

References

 

National men's volleyball teams
National junior team
Volleyball